Jordan, Indiana may refer to:

Jordan, Daviess County, Indiana
Jordan, Owen County, Indiana